Azimullah is a male Muslim given name, composed of the elements Azim and Allah. It may refer to

Azimullah Khan (1830?-1859?), Indian politician
Evert Azimullah, Surinamese diplomat, politician and writer
Azimullah, Afghan, former Guantanamo detainee (ISN 1050)

Arabic masculine given names